The 2009–10 Omani League (known as the Oman Mobile League for sponsorship reasons) was the 34th edition of the top football league in Oman. It began on 12 September 2009 and finished on 7 May 2010. Al-Nahda Club were the defending champions, having won the previous 2008–09 Oman League season. On Friday, 7 May 2010, Al-Suwaiq Club played out a 1–1 draw away in their final league match against Al-Nasr S.C.S.C. and emerged as the champions of the 2009–10 Oman Mobile League with a total of 44 points.

Teams
This season the league had 12 teams. Sur SC and Sohar SC were relegated to the Second Division League after finishing in the relegation zone in the 2008-09 season. The two relegated teams were replaced by Second Division League teams Al-Suwaiq Club and Oman Club.

Stadia and locations

League table

Results

Promotion/relegation play-off

1st leg

2nd leg

Al Oruba secured promotion after winning 2:1 on aggregate

Season statistics

Top scorers

Media coverage

See also
2009 Sultan Qaboos Cup
2009–10 Oman First Division League

References

Top level Omani football league seasons
1
Oman